Le Monde mensuel was a French language monthly news magazine published in Paris, France, from 2010 to 2014. It mostly covered selected articles from Le Monde published in the preceding month.

History and profile
Le Monde mensuel was first published on 4 February 2010. It was a monthly news magazine published on the first Thursday of each month. The publisher of the monthly was Le Monde SA and the magazine had its headquarters in Paris. In addition to the articles of Le Monde, the 120-page monthly also included a detailed analysis of news.

The editorial team of Le Monde mensuel was led by Jerome Gauthere. The magazine ceased publication in 2014.

References

2010 establishments in France
2014 disestablishments in France
Defunct magazines published in France
French-language magazines
Magazines established in 2010
Magazines disestablished in 2014
Magazines published in Paris
Monthly magazines published in France
News magazines published in France